Rasul (also spelled Rasool, Rasoul, or Resul) is the Arabic for "messenger, apostle", see Apostle (Islam).
It is also  masculine given name, it may refer to:

Given name
 Rasoul Amani, New Zealand wrestler
 Rasul Amin, Afghan politician
 Rasul Douglas, American football player
 Rasul Guliyev, Azerbaijani politician
 Rasul Jan, Pakistani chemist
 Rasoul Khadem, Iranian wrestler 
 Rasul Khan, Indian monarch
 Rasoul Khatibi, Iranian footballer
 Rasoul Korbekandi, Iranian footballer
 Rasoul Mirtoroghi, Iranian footballer
 Rasoul Momeni, Iranian politician
 Rasoul Pirzadeh, Iranian footballer
 Resul Pookutty, Indian sound designer
 Resul Tekeli, Turkish volleyball player
Resul Dindar, Laz-Turkish singer
Rasoul Mollagholipour, Iranian film director
Resul Elvan, Turkish Weightlifter
Resul Kastrati, Albanian footballer
Rasul Mirzaev, Dagestani Mixed Martial Artist
Rasul Rza, Azerbaijani writer

See also
Rasul (surname)
Rasulov
Rasul (disambiguation)
 Abdul Rasul (disambiguation), Arabic theophoric name

Arabic masculine given names
Iranian masculine given names
Turkish masculine given names